New Home  is a small city in Lynn County, Texas, United States. The population was 334 at the 2010 census.

History
The agricultural community of New Home was originally part of the Deuce of Hearts Ranch. A portion of the ranch was platted and opened for settlement in the 1890s. The community was initially called Deuce of Hearts but the name was later changed to New Home. Farming began in the area between 1905 and 1910, and an identifiable community had formed there by the 1930s. The economy of New Home has always been closely linked to cotton production and ginning.  In 1985, the New Home Co-op Gin processed 12,000 bales of cotton.

Geography
New Home is located on the high plains of the Llano Estacado.

Demographics

As of the census of 2000, there were 320 people, 100 households, and 81 families residing in the city. The population density was 319.2 people per square mile (123.6/km). There were 108 housing units at an average density of 107.7/sq mi (41.7/km). The racial makeup of the city was 73.44% White, 0.31% African American, 25.00% from other races, and 1.25% from two or more races. Hispanic or Latino of any race were 52.81% of the population.

There were 100 households, out of which 46.0% had children under the age of 18 living with them, 74.0% were married couples living together, 5.0% had a female householder with no husband present, and 19.0% were non-families. 15.0% of all households were made up of individuals, and 8.0% had someone living alone who was 65 years of age or older. The average household size was 3.17 and the average family size was 3.54.

In the city, the population was spread out, with 35.6% under the age of 18, 8.8% from 18 to 24, 29.7% from 25 to 44, 15.0% from 45 to 64, and 10.9% who were 65 years of age or older. The median age was 30 years. For every 100 females, there were 105.1 males. For every 100 females age 18 and over, there were 92.5 males.

The median income for a household in the city was $39,063, and the median income for a family was $42,083. Males had a median income of $26,250 versus $25,417 for females. The per capita income for the city was $15,222. About 5.3% of families and 9.7% of the population were below the poverty line, including 8.7% of those under age 18 and none of those age 65 or over.

Education
The City of New Home is served by the New Home Independent School District.

See also
Woodrow, Texas
Slide, Texas
Close City, Texas
Llano Estacado

References

External links

Cities in Texas
Cities in Lynn County, Texas
1930s establishments in Texas